The 1993 Torneo Descentralizado was the 78th season of the top category of Peruvian football (soccer). A total of 16 teams competed in the tournament. Universitario de Deportes conquered its twenty-first Primera División.

Changes from 1992 
 Due to the 1993 Copa América, a minor tournament (1993 Torneo Intermedio) was played in the middle of the year between the 16 clubs. The winner would qualify for the 1994 Copa CONMEBOL.
 The end-of-season Liguilla would feature 4 teams, instead of 6.
 A preliminary round prior to the Liguilla would be played with the teams that placed 3 to 8 to determine the 3 teams that join the second-placed team in the Liguilla.
 The third-to-last team in the Torneo Descentralizado plays a relegation playoff against Copa Perú runner-up.

Teams

Torneo Descentralizado 
The Torneo Descentralizado was played with as a double round-robin tournament. Universitario de Deportes as champions qualified for the 1994 Copa Libertadores. Alianza Lima advanced to the end-of-season Liguilla and received a bonus point for placing second. The teams that placed 3 to 8 advanced to a preliminary round.

Relegation play-off

Pre-Liguilla

Liguilla 
Alianza Lima started the Liguilla with a bonus point. Alianza Lima and Sporting Cristal tied for first placed, forcing a playoff match to determine the second Peruvian club in the 1994 Copa Libertadores. Although Sporting Cristal lost the playoff match, they qualified for the 1994 Copa CONMEBOL after Deportivo Municipal declined to play in it.

Liguilla play-off

External links 
 RSSSF Peru 1993 by Carlos Manuel Nieto Tarazona, José Luis Pierrend, Eli Schmerler

Peru
1
Peruvian Primera División seasons